Amdavad Municipal Transport Service (AMTS) runs the public bus service in the city of Ahmedabad in India.The responsibility of the administration of AMTS comes under the Amdavad Municipal Corporation

History

Private operators
There existed three transport services viz. ABC Co. (Ahmadabad  Bus Corporation), Morris Transport and Munshi Bus service, before the municipal bus service. There was a shortage of petrol till 1946 due to the Second World War and the petrol supply was in limited quantity even in 1947 when the municipal bus service started. Coal gas was used as a fuel earlier in the buses and many buses were plying on gas. There were approximately 50,000 commuters who travelled in such buses. Morris company operated some 32 bus routes in the city. The buses ran on Gandhi Road, and Relief Road from Bhadra in the city area. There were clockwise and anti-clockwise routes running from Shahpur to Shahpur. Moreover, there were other routes for Shahibaug, Dudheshwar, Vadaj, Sabarmati and Calico Mills outside the city area. There were buses for Asarva, Khokhara-Mehmdabad, Gomtipur, Amraiwadi and Maninagar in the eastern area, while Paldi, Vasna, Ambawadi and Commerce College routes were covered on the western bank of the Sabarmati River. Buses for the Sabarmati area ran from Vadaj.

The first communal riots took place in 1941, and the atmosphere was tense in 1946 also. The buses run by private companies closed down during the emergency period, and hence the citizens felt insecurity and difficulty. The private companies' (Austin and Studebaker) buses were in wretched condition, having wooden seats without sponge, a curse for the commuters, because the profit motive was at the centre for such commercial organizations. Hence the citizens demanded heavily for a public transport service.

The minimum bus fare was one Anna (6 paise), and the maximum bus fare was three Annas (20 paise). They were in force from 1-1-47.

Public sector operation

Amdavad municipality decided to start a bus service in the public sector, keeping in view the ideal to end the troubles of the people and to give them good service at reasonable rates.

There were 60 municipal buses running on the road on 1-4-47. There was a lot of excitement for the new buses, and the people thronged on the bus routes to see the municipal buses, because the public sector city bus service was the first of its kind in Amdavad, and the citizens gave a very warm welcome to it. The people of the city took pride in the bus service started by the municipality. The seats were spongy and comfortable in the new buses. All the routes started from Lal Darwaja (Bhadra) and the railway station. The route numbers were similar to those of the Morris Company, with minor changes, so that the passengers should not face any problems at that time.

Clockwise and anti-clockwise circular routes were started from Lal Darwaja. When the bus service began in 1947, buses were not delivered in requisite number, hence certain buses were hired for a month, to cater for the urgent need, from Gujarat Motors Ltd. on a daily rent of Rs.50. Due to an inconvient body for the city-service, they were stopped as soon as the organization got its own buses.

Insurance
The third party insurance risk was not covered from the beginning under the Motor Vehicle Act Section 94 (2), therefore the amount equivalent to its premium was decided to be deposited, and Mumbai state government was requested for exemption on the said amount. The request was granted. It was granted that all the municipal transport service staff would get monthly Rs. 5 as a grain rebate.

New buses
As deliveries were received from the bus dealers, more buses came on the roads. An order was given to General Motors to buy 225 buses in total. Out of that, 143 buses were received up to September 1947. The petrol supply was inadequate in those days, due to government regulations, so the buses on the road were much fewer than was required. However, there was a considerable increase in the number of passengers as compared to private bus-management. In 1947-48, the daily number of passenger were one Lakh, nine thousand.

Administration
The department was considered as a section of the Municipality before the separation of the transport fund on 1-8-1950. Separate accounts of AMTS service were maintained, taking into consideration the payments released from 1-4-1950 onwards from the municipal office, and accordingly, AMTS estimate Budget-‘B' for 1951-52 was presented in the General Meeting of the Municipal corporation by the transport committee through a standing committee in Dec. 1950. In Jan. 1951, an All India Convention Committee meeting was held in Gujarat Vidyapith, Amdavad. At that time, a bus-stand was erected near Vidyapith in order to assist the crowds gathered to attend to their beloved leaders. On 30 Jan 1951, Mahatma Gandhi’s death-anniversary, people participated in great numbers in the mass-spinning programme at Harijan Ashram. There, also, proper bus arrangements were made. Special arrangements were also made for the S.S.C exam at the demand of the National Student Union. A new transport committee was appointed on 19-7-1951 after the conversion of the municipality into a corporation. At the end of the year 1951-52, the organization had 205 buses.

More new buses
With the expansion of the city area and progress in industries, AMTS field became wider. Various new housing colonies, schools and factories cropped up across the river towards the west in Maninagar, Vadaj, Sabarmati and east of the railway line, and it was necessary to add more bus-routes to cope with public demand. Sixty-five new buses were purchased and these had diesel engines, so fuel expense were decreased in the 1954-55 budget. Tyre-tube and spare-part expenses were also lower in the new fleet of buses. Temporary staff at the workshop was also limited. Carriage capacity of the new buses was comparatively more due to a greater number of seats, but estimated bus-fare income was at par with last year, Rs. .

Fleet
At present, AMTS has 1292 buses serving the city in which 977 runs under AMTS & 315 under Janmarg.

Politeness week
"Politeness week" was celebrated from 21-3-55 to 27-3-55 by the organization. The staff had made this event successful with spirit, and many appreciation letters were received as a symbol of people’s response. This eventful week was inaugurated at Lal Darwaja by the Mayor in the presence of outstanding citizens. The respected Mayor had awarded Rs. 20 as an inspirational prize to sincere drivers and conductors. Therefore, the staff got the feeling of zeal and awareness, supported by encouragement for better performance.

Growth
Demand for transportation services grew with the development of Amdavad city. Bus routes up to Kathwada, Lambha, Ranip, Hathijan, Vanch, Ramol, Nikol and Amli Road were started during 1960. This facility helped the villagers and the students to visit Amdavad city. Thus the Municipal Transport service has played an important role in the development of suburbs and nearby villages. The development of remote areas has been assisted by AMTS buses. The organization had to bear losses in earlier years, by following the service-oriented attitude, but it has resulted in speedy development of the city.

The organization has adopted a service-oriented approach, and the following matters have benefited the society:

 night and morning service for textile workers
 special routes from Government Colonies to secretariate and new civil hospital
 special concession rates for children and students
 free pass scheme for the blind
 concessional pass for professional and medical post-graduate students

The transport service became popular among citizens as well as tourists visiting the city during last 7 years, because the arrangement of two modern coaches facilitated city tours, specially engaged tours, religious places tours, picnic tours for students at discounted rates and also a bus-facility at public functions. Moreover, "The Merry-go-round service" was introduced around Kankaria lake and it was attractive for children. This way the organization created a unique image of its own.

The financial aspect was almost balanced. There was enough provision in the budget for loans to purchase new buses, repayment of the instalments of the loan borrowed from the corporation, instalments for loan and sinking fund, depreciation fund, insurance fund, and also instalments for gratuity funds. Though the economic progress of the organization was satisfactory, no major increase was made in the rates of bus fare and each section was managed skillfully with frugality. The existing bus fare rates were good enough to meet the price-rise of diesel fuel and other supplies.

AMTS has been managed by a Transport Manager under the Transport Committee and Municipal Corporation from the very inception. The organization has adopted a service-oriented attitude, so one should not consider it as a firm or a company, but as a service organization. AMTS is a voluntary service managed by Ahmedabad Municipal Corporation.

Upgrading

AMTS will begin upgrading the red buses carrying local passengers in Ahmedabad and these red buses are different compared to the previous generation of red buses. The new environmentally-friendly buses will run on compressed natural gas (CNG) fuel and are similar to the local low-floor buses of Delhi. Some of the new features in these buses are:
Low floor buses with sliding door at both sides
Comfortable fiber seat. Latest handle, steering and dashboard
33-passenger capacity, 60 can stand at one time
Four LCD screens in each bus
GPS connectivity available
Fire safety kit, announce system, emergency window

AMTS intends to buy 400 such buses, at a cost of Rs 1.17 billion, in one year.

External links 
 Official website of Ahmedabad Municipal Transport Service
 Easily accessible Bus Routes information for AMTS Ahmedabad

References 

Transport in Ahmedabad
Municipal transport agencies of India
1947 establishments in India
Indian companies established in 1947